Dean L. Cameron (born January 20, 1961) is the Director of the Idaho Department of Insurance and a Republican former member of the Idaho Senate.

Early life and career
Cameron achieved his Associate of Arts in political science at Ricks College in 1984. He worked as an insurance salesman at Rupert Abstract Company and is currently its co-owner and employed at Cameron & Seamons, INC.

He was a youth committeeman of the Republican Party from 1984 to 1988.  He was a Republican precinct committeeman from 1988 to 1990.

Idaho Senate 

In 1991, Senator Lynn Tominaga resigned to accept a position at the Idaho Water Users Association. The Legislative District 24 Central Committee met to fill the vacancy and sent three names to Governor Cecil Andrus. Andrus subsequently selected Cameron to fill the remainder of Tominaga's term.

After redistricting, in 1992 Cameron sought reelection and was challenged by Representative Ralph Peters in the primary and by Democrat Jason Stolldorf in the general election. In the 1994 Republican primary, Cameron was challenged by Harold Mohlmon. Cameron easily dispatched Democratic challengers in 2002 and 2008, and defeated Mohlmon again in the 2010 Republican primary.

In 2012, Cameron filed for reelection and defeated rancher Doug Pickett in the 2012 Republican primary.

On January 14, 2015, Cameron resigned from the Idaho Senate and accepted his appointment as the Director of the Idaho Department of Insurance.

Cameron was the highest-ranking member of the Idaho Senate.

Committee assignments
Cameron previously served as a member of the following committees:
 Commerce and Human Resources (chair)
 Finance
 Health Care Task Force (co-chair)
 High Risk Pool Advisory
 Joint Finance and Appropriations (co-chair)
 Resources and Environment

Idaho Department of Insurance
Cameron serves as the Idaho Department of Insurance and was appointed by Governor Butch Otter to that post on June 15, 2015. He was reappointed to another four-year term by Governor Brad Little on January 4, 2019.

As an active member of National Association of Insurance Commissioners, Cameron serves as the treasurer and secretary.

Elections

References

External links 
 http://www.doi.idaho.gov/about/Dean_biography.aspx 

1961 births
Latter Day Saints from Idaho
Brigham Young University–Idaho alumni
Republican Party Idaho state senators
Living people
People from Rupert, Idaho
People from Burley, Idaho